For the Bleeders is an album by metalcore/hardcore band Vision of Disorder. Released on August 24, 1999, this is the band's only release on Go-Kart Records. It contains a collection of re-recorded songs from various demo's from the early 1990s, along with two new originals.

Track listing
"Choke" - 2:29
"Adelaide" - 2:58
"Watch Out" - 2:14
"7/13" - 3:16
"For the Bleeders" - 2:41
"No Regret" - 2:05
"Formula for Failure" (1999 Version) - 4:15
"Beneath the Green" - 4:08
"Take Them Out" (1999 Version) - 3:20
"In the Room" - 3:03

References

1999 albums
Go-Kart Records albums
Vision of Disorder albums